Javier Duch (born 23 June 1964) is a Spanish racing cyclist. He rode in the 1991 Tour de France.

References

External links
 

1964 births
Living people
Spanish male cyclists
Place of birth missing (living people)
Cyclists from Barcelona